Elise Forrest Harleston (February 8, 1891 – 1970) is known as South Carolina’s first female African-American photographer. She was also one of the first Black female photographers in the United States.

Elise Beatrice Forrest was born in Charleston, South Carolina, on February 8, 1891, to Elvira Moorer and Augustus Forrest, who worked as an accountant. Elise’s paternal grandmother had been a “free person of color.” 

Elise Beatrice Forrest became Elise Forrest Harleston after she married successful African-American painter Edwin Augustus Harleston, who was nine years her senior.

Career and Education 
Elise and Edwin Augustus Harleston met in Charleston, South Carolina in 1913, when Elise was 22 years old. Both Elise and Edwin were graduates of the Avery Normal Institute, a private school for Black youth  that was established in 1868. Elise graduated from the Avery Normal Institute in 1910. After graduating, she worked as a teacher in South Carolina. In the early 20th century, it was against the law for African Americans to work in Charleston’s public schools, so Elise worked in rural South Carolina. However, she soon grew tired of the experience and returned to Charleston, where she then worked as a seamstress at the Union Millinery & Notion Company.

At the time, Edwin wanted to further his knowledge of painting, and he was set to study abroad. However, money struggles forced him to return home and work for his family's funeral business. In 1916, his father sent him to the Renouard Training School for Embalmers in Manhattan. Elise asked many friends in New York if she could stay with them so she could remain close to her boyfriend. Eventually, Elise was able to obtain a job and teach impoverished students at Long Island. When the two of them returned home, Edwin supported Elise in enrolling in photography school despite the advice of their families so the two could marry and open a studio together.

In the fall of 1919, Elise traveled to New York City and enrolled at the E. Brunel School of Photography. There, Elise was one of only two other African-American students, and she was the only female. Edwin and Elise married on September 15, 1920. Elise then enrolled, with Edwin’s encouragement, at the Tuskegee Institute in Alabama in 1921. There, she had the opportunity to take graduate courses with C.M. Battey, who was the head of the Photography Division. Under his tutelage, Elise became a part of the artistic community that challenged racist stereotypes of African Americans, and her works reflected the image of the "New Negro".

Soon, Edwin and Elise both returned to Charleston.  In 1922, when becoming tired of working for his family's funeral business, Edwin planned to open a photography and painting studio with Elise.  In the spring of 1922, as promised, they opened Harleston Studio: 118 Calhoun Street in Charleston. Their studio lasted from 1922 to 1932. There she produced and sold a series of portraits of Charleston's black street vendors. Edwin was the painter, and Elise was the photographer. As Edwin was a portrait painter, Elise would often photograph his subjects, and he would paint from her photographs, such as the subject of his prize-winning drawing A Colored Grand Army Man. This allowed his clients to save many hours of painful posing. Despite this, more credit is provided to Edwin for his work than to Elise for her contribution to the Harleston Studio.

Family 
Although Edwin and Elise did not have children of their own, they raised Edwin’s niece, Edwina “Gussie” Augusta Harleston Whitlock. Edwina was the daughter of Marie Isabella Forrest and Robert Othello Harleston, who both suffered from tuberculosis. They also took in Doris.

Displayed Work
Aaron Douglas worked with Edwin to create a set of murals that are displayed at Fisk University.

Two of Elise's black-and-white photographs were part of an international exhibition in 1996, "A History of Women Photographers." They were showcased at the New York Public Library. This was the first time Elise's work was to be showcased outside of South Carolina.

Life after Edwin 
After kissing his deathly ill father, Edwin Harleston died of pneumonia in 1931.  Elise closed her studio and remarried within a year, to schoolteacher John J. Wheeler.  She moved to Baltimore, then to Chicago, and then to Southern California, where she remained until her death from a brain aneurysm in 1970.  According to her great-niece, Edwina's daughter Mae Whitlock Gentry, she never spoke of her relationship with Edwin or her work as a photographer.

After Harleston's death in 1970, her family found Edwin's letters and a cache of almost two dozen glass plate negatives that she had saved.  Many of her papers are now held by Emory University's Stuart A. Rose Manuscript, Archives, and Rare Book Library.

Quotes from Edwin Harleston and Elise Harleston 
“Find out for me, please, every fine point about photographing a drawing and a painting for patent reasons ---we may need it someday." - Edwin Harleston to Elise Harleston

"I'm glad to learn that you're doing a little work sufficiently good to charge people for it ---keep it up." - Edwin Harleston to Elise Harleston, 1920 

“Nineteen hundred and twenty must be our year." Edwin Harleston to Elise Harleston, about their upcoming marriage.

"He is wonderful! He is worthy of all I've gone through in waiting for him. He is the soul of honor, and he is my husband!" Elise Harleston, in reference to her marriage to Edwin.

References

Further reading
 Ball, Edward. The Sweet Hell Inside: The Rise of an Elite Black Family in the Segregated South. William Morrow, 2001.

1891 births
1970 deaths
African-American photographers
Tuskegee University alumni
20th-century American photographers
20th-century African-American artists
Deaths from intracranial aneurysm